Irma Vep is a 1996 French comedy-drama film written and directed by Olivier Assayas. Hong Kong actress Maggie Cheung plays a fictionalised version of herself, as disasters result when an unstable French film director (played by Jean-Pierre Léaud) attempts to remake Louis Feuillade's classic silent film serial Les Vampires (1915–16). (Irma Vep is an anagram for the word "vampire".) Taking place largely through the eyes of a foreigner (Cheung), it is also a meditation on the state of the French film industry.

Irma Vep was screened in the Un Certain Regard section at the 1996 Cannes Film Festival.

In 2022, the film was reimagined as a miniseries for HBO.

Plot 
The plot mirrors the disorientation felt by director René Vidal during a troubled production of a film-within-a-film. Maggie Cheung has been cast to play the film's heroine, Irma Vep, a burglar and a spy, who dresses in a tight, black, latex rubber catsuit. Irma Vep, it is explained, is an anagram for vampire, but she is not a literal vampire. Rather, she is the inspiration for a criminal gang named The Vampires, as in Feuillade's original serial.

René, the cast and crew view the film's dailies and he angrily declares the footage terrible and soulless. After he storms out, everyone else quickly departs the facility, leaving Maggie stranded. She accepts an invitation from the costume designer, Zoé, to a group dinner with other crew members. There, Zoé confides to another woman that she is romantically interested in Maggie, which the woman then tells Maggie, embarrassing her.

After the dinner with the other crew members, Maggie visits René at a hotel in the aftermath of a violent episode with his wife. René admits that he had mainly wanted to make the film because he desired to see her in it. Later that evening, Maggie, apparently possessed by her character, dons the catsuit and steals jewelry from a hotel suite while a nude woman argues on the phone with her boyfriend. She then throws away the jewelry.

The next morning, Zoé picks an exhausted Maggie up from her hotel room. René is a no-show on the set, and the crew attempt to film without him. At the end of the day, imperious film director José Mirano meets Maggie's costar Laure at a bar and tells her René has had a breakdown and that he has been hired to complete the film. He firmly contends that a Chinese actress should not be playing Irma Vep, who he sees as an icon within French culture. José tells her he intends to replace Maggie with Laure.

Zoé and Maggie take a taxi to a rave, but Maggie declines to go at the last minute and departs in the taxi. Zoé, looking disappointed, walks through the crowd at the rave.

José and the cast and crew gather at the screening facility to view the rushes that René has personally edited. Maggie is not there, however, and it is said that she has left for America to work on a film with Ridley Scott. The film ends with the rushes, which have been cut into a hallucinatory montage with numerous scratches and other modifications being done to the film itself. The future of the production is not revealed.

Cast

Allusions to French film history
The film refers to iconic figures in French film history: Louis Feuillade, Musidora, Arletty, François Truffaut, the Groupe SLON, Alain Delon, and Catherine Deneuve. Thematically, the film questions the place of French cinema today. According to Chris Darke, it is not a "mourning for cinema with the romantic nostalgia" but "more like the Mexican Day of the Dead: remembrance as an act of celebration". Furthermore, Dale Hudson of Screen wrote, "It is less a film about re-presenting the past, than it is a film about addressing the present, specifically the place of France within the global economy."

Production 
The idea for the film was born out of an attempted collaboration among Assayas, Claire Denis, and Atom Egoyan, who wanted to experiment with the situation of a foreigner in Paris. In the 1915 original serial, written and directed by Louis Feuillade, Irma Vep was played by French silent film actress Musidora (1889–1957). Much of the film depicts set-related incidents that echo scenes in Truffaut's 1973 film Day for Night, to which Irma Vep owes a large thematic debt.

However, Assayas publicly stated that although he considers La nuit americaine a great film, it is more about the fantasy of filmmaking than the reality. Assayas credits as a greater inspiration Rainer Werner Fassbinder's Beware of a Holy Whore, in which Lou Castel, who plays the replacement director José Mirano in this film, plays a film director.

Assayas wrote the script in ten weeks, and the film was shot in a month, with no retakes. "Its hasty production circumstances seem perilously close to the ones that cause everyone such grief in the film."

Assayas married Cheung in 1998. They divorced in 2001. They again collaborated in 2004 on the film Clean.

Reception
Irma Vep received a positive critical response. On Rotten Tomatoes, the film holds a rating of 94% based on 47 reviews with an average rating of 7.4/10. The website's critics consensus reads, "Starring a bewitching Maggie Cheung, Irma Vep is an evocative and reflexive satire of the filmmaking process that is bursting at the seams with an affection for cinema." On Metacritic, it has a metascore of 80 out of 100 based on 21 reviews, indicating "generally favorable reviews".

References in other media
Lettrist footage from the film, along with shots from the original Les Vampires, are used in White Ring's video for their single "IxC999".

A character in the five-comic series "Anno Dracula – 1895: Seven Days in Mayhem" by Kim Newman and Paul McCaffrey is based on Irma Vep.

Home media
Irma Vep was released on Blu-ray and DVD through The Criterion Collection on 27 April 2021.

Television adaptation

HBO produced a limited television series adaptation of the film that premiered at the Cannes Film Festival on 22 May 2022, and was released on 6 June 2022 on HBO. It stars Alicia Vikander, Vincent Macaigne, Adria Arjona, Byron Bowers, Devon Ross, Carrie Brownstein, Tom Sturridge and Fala Chen and was written and directed by Assayas.

See also
 The Mystery of Irma Vep, a 1984 play for two characters by Charles Ludlam
 Lettrism, inspiration for some sequences of the film

References

External links
 
 
 
 
 
 Irma Vep: Film in Flux – an essay by Aliza Ma at The Criterion Collection

1996 films
1996 comedy-drama films
1990s English-language films
1990s French-language films
1996 multilingual films
English-language French films
Films about filmmaking
Films adapted into television shows
Films directed by Olivier Assayas
Films with screenplays by Olivier Assayas
French comedy-drama films
French multilingual films
1990s French films